The 2008 winners of the Torneo di Viareggio (in English, the Viareggio Tournament, officially the Viareggio Cup World Football Tournament Coppa Carnevale), the annual youth football tournament held in Viareggio, Tuscany, are listed below.

Format 
The 48 teams are seeded in 12 pools, split up into 6-pool groups. Each team from a pool meets the others in a single tie. The winning club from each pool and two best runners-up from both group A and group B progress to the final knockout stage. All matches in the final rounds are single tie. The Round of 16 envisions penalties and no extra time, while the rest of the final round matches include 30 minutes extra time and penalties to be played if the draw between teams still holds. Semifinal losing teams play 3rd-place final with penalties after regular time. The winning sides play the final with extra time and repeat the match if the draw holds.

Participating teams
Italian teams

  Ascoli
  Atalanta
  Benevento
  Castelnuovo
  Cesena
  Cisco Roma
  Cuoiocappiano
  Empoli
  Fiorentina
  Genoa
  Inter Milan
  Juventus
  Lazio
  Massese
  Milan
  Novara
  Parma
  Pergocrema
  Piacenza
  Serie D Representatives
  Reggina
  Rimini
  Roma
  Città di San Benedetto
  Sampdoria
  Sansovino
  Siena
  Torino
  Vicenza

European teams

  Anderlecht
  Belasica
  Interblock Ljubljana
  Midtjylland
  Olympiacos
  Shakhtar Donetsk
  Sparta Praha
  Spartak Moscow
  Tottenham
  Újpest

Asian teams

  Malaysian Indian
  Paxtakor

African Team

  A.S. De Camberene
  International Allies

American teams

  L.I.A.C. of New York
  Club Guaraní
  River Plate
  Pumas

Oceanian teams
   APIA Tigers

Group stage

Group 1

Group 2

Group 3

Group 4

Group 5

Group 6

Group 7

Group 8

Group 9

Group 10

Group 11

Group 12

Knockout stage

Champions

Top goalscorers

7 goals

  Mario Balotelli ( Inter Milan)
  Stefano Scappini ( Sampdoria)

6 goals
  Samuel Di Carmine ( Fiorentina)
5 goals

  Samon Reider Rodríguez ( Serie D Repress.)
  Emmanuel Ledesma ( Genoa)

Footnotes

External links
 Official Site (Italian)
Results on RSSSF.COM

2008
2007–08 in European football
2007–08 in Italian football
2007–08 in Argentine football
2007–08 in Mexican football
2007–08 in Ghanaian football
2008 in American soccer
2008 in Australian soccer
2008 in Paraguayan football